Cinderella (Original Motion Picture Soundtrack) is the soundtrack album to the 2021 film, Cinderella. The soundtrack was released by Epic Records in the United States, Columbia Records in the United Kingdom, and Sony Music labels globally. "Million to One", performed by Camila Cabello, was released on July 21, 2021, as the first promotional single of the soundtrack. "Somebody to Love", performed by Nicholas Galitzine, was released on August 3, 2021 as an instant grant second promotional single, along with the pre-order for the album.  "Dream Girl (Nile Rodgers Remix)", performed by Idina Menzel, was released on September 9, 2021, as the third promotional single.

Background
In April 2019, it was announced that Camila Cabello was working on the music for the film. In October, 2020, Idina Menzel confirmed that "[she and Camila] both have original songs as well." On August 2, 2021, it was announced by the director Kay Cannon that the soundtrack would be released by Epic Records on September 3, 2021.

Commercial performance
In the United Kingdom, Cinderella debuted at number 2 on the Official Soundtrack Albums Chart, number 8 on the UK Compilation Chart, and number 14 on the UK Albums Downloads Chart. In Australia, the soundtrack debuted at 86 on the ARIA Top 100 Albums chart. In Spain, the soundtrack debuted at 94 on the PROMUSICAE top 100 albums chart. In the United States, the soundtrack debuted at number 2 on the Billboard Top Soundtrack chart and number 127 on the Billboard 200.

Track listings

Notes
  indicates an arranger
  indicates a miscellaneous producer
  indicates a vocal producer

Charts

Release history

References 

2021 soundtrack albums
Works based on Cinderella